Multimedia encyclopedia of the Qur'an which is called Jami al-Tafasir. Exhibition of complete texts of 184 commentaries of different Islamic sects in 1225 volumes such as: Min Wahy al-Qur`an, al-Tebyan Fi Tasfir al-Qur`an, Noor al-Thaqalain, Kashful Asrar wa Edatol Abrar, Tafsir al-Qur`an al-Karim, al-Amthal Fi Tafsir al-Ketab al-Munzal, al-Mizan Fi Tafsir al-Qur`an from Muhammad Husayn Tabatabaei, Tafsir Nemouneh, Majma’ al-Bayan Fi Tafsir al-Qur`an, Tafsir Rawdh al-Jinan and Tafsir Beidhawi.

this is provided the present program with great content and useful options to simplify the research path for the researches of Islamic sciences and Qur'anic scholars.

Multimedia
Tafsir works